Madasphecia is a genus of moths in the family Sesiidae.

Species
Madasphecia griveaudi (Viette, 1982)
Madasphecia puera (Viette, 1957)

References

Sesiidae